The Mount Pleasant Carnegie Library, at 24 E. Main St. in Mount Pleasant, Utah, was built as a Carnegie library in 1917.  It was listed on the National Register of Historic Places in 1984.

It was designed by architects Ware & Treganza in Prairie School style.

It is the only Carnegie library without a centered front door;  consistent with Prairie Style the entrance is instead indirect, in this case through sides of a bay projecting to the front.

It was built by local contractors Bent R. Hansen, August Larsen, and John
Stansfield.

References

Carnegie libraries in Utah
National Register of Historic Places in Sanpete County, Utah
Prairie School architecture
Library buildings completed in 1917